Only the Valiant or The Charge of the Brave (Spanish:La carga de los valientes) is a 1940 Argentine historical drama film directed by Adelqui Migliar and starring Santiago Arrieta, Domingo Sapelli and Anita Jordán. The film was one of the most expensive productions made in Argentina. It portrays the 1827 defence of Carmen de Patagones against Brazilian forces during the Cisplatine War.

The film's sets were designed by the art director Ralph Pappier. Eva Perón, the future wife of dictator Juan Perón, had a supporting part in the film.

Cast
 Santiago Arrieta 
 Domingo Sapelli 
 Anita Jordán 
 Froilán Varela 
 Juan Sarcione 
 Roberto Fugazot 
 Carlos Fioriti 
 Eduardo Trino 
 Blanca Orgaz 
 Amalia Bernabé 
 Alberto Terrones 
 Toti Muñoz 
 Eva Duarte 
 Nelo Cosimi 
 Néstor Deval 
 Rafael Smurro 
 Héctor Torres 
 René Mugica 
 Roberto Velázquez 
 Joaquín Larrazábal
 Ricardo de Rosas

References

Bibliography 
 Plazaola, Luis Trelles. South American Cinema. La Editorial, UPR, 1989.

External links 

1940 films
Argentine historical drama films
1940s historical drama films
1940s Spanish-language films
Films directed by Adelqui Migliar
Films set in the 1820s
Argentine black-and-white films
1940 drama films
1940s Argentine films